Rodniki is a rural locality (a village) in Ivano-Kazansky Selsoviet, Iglinsky District, Bashkortostan, Russia. The population was 84 as of 2010. There are 2 streets.

Geography 
Rodniki is located 37 km south of Iglino (the district's administrative centre) by road. Slutka is the nearest rural locality.

References 

Rural localities in Iglinsky District